This is a list of foreign missions and other diplomatic missions in Kuala Lumpur, Malaysia.

Foreign missions

External links 

Foreign relations of Malaysia
Buildings and structures in Kuala Lumpur
Embassies of Kuala Lumpur
Embassies in Kuala Laumpur